Lagrange's formula may refer to a number of results named after Joseph Louis Lagrange:
Lagrange interpolation formula
Lagrange–Bürmann formula
Triple product expansion
Mean value theorem
Euler–Lagrange equation